Pleurofusia is an extinct genus of sea snails, marine gastropod molluscs in the family Drilliidae.

Species
Species within the genus Pleurofusia include:
 † Pleurofusia crassinoda (Des Moulins, 1842) 
 † Pleurofusia dowlingi Petuch 1997 
 † Pleurofusia feddeni Noetling 1895
 † Pleurofusia fluctuosa Harris 1937
 † Pleurofusia fusus Vredenburg 1921
 † Pleurofusia longirostropsis (de Gregorio, 1890) 
 † Pleurofusia paulensis Lozouet, 2015 
 † Pleurofusia phasma Vredenburg 1921
 † Pleurofusia pseudocrassinoda Lozouet, 2015 
 † Pleurofusia pseudosubtilis (Peyrot, 1931) 
 † Pleurofusia scala Vredenburg 1921
 † Pleurofusia tauzini Lozouet, 2015

References

 E. Vredenburg. 1921. Comparative diagnoses of Pleurotomidae from the Tertiary formations of Burma. Records of the Geological Survey of India 53:83-129
 W. P. Woodring. 1970. Geology and paleontology of canal zone and adjoining parts of Panama: Description of Tertiary mollusks (gastropods: Eulimidae, Marginellidae to Helminthoglyptidae). United States Geological Survey Professional Paper 306(D):299–452
 E. J. Petuch. 1997. A new gastropod fauna from an Oligocene back-reef lagoonal environment in west central Florida. The Nautilus 110(4):122–138
 Lozouet P. (2015). Nouvelles espèces de gastéropodes (Mollusca: Gastropoda) de l'Oligocène et du Miocène inférieur d'Aquitaine (Sud-Ouest de la France). Partie 5. Cossmanniana. 17: 15–84

External links
 Fossilworks: Pleurofusia

 
Prehistoric gastropod genera